Robert James Hulse (born 5 January 1957) is an English former footballer who played as a defender or midfielder in the Football League for Darlington and in France for Stade Quimpérois. He spent several spells with Gateshead; he was a member of their 1985–86 Northern Premier League title-winning squad, and made more than 200 appearances spread over a ten-year period. He also played non-league football for Newcastle Blue Star and for Barrow, with whom he won the Northern Premier League in 1988–89.

Hulse was sent off for persistent fouling on his Darlington debut, on 24 September 1983 at home to Fourth Division leaders York City. York's goalkeeper, Roger Jones, had earlier been sent off for a professional foul. The game finished goalless.

After leaving football he worked in demolition before moving into property development.

References

1957 births
Living people
Footballers from Gateshead
English footballers
Association football defenders
Gateshead F.C. players
Darlington F.C. players
Newcastle Blue Star F.C. players
Barrow A.F.C. players
Northern Premier League players
English Football League players